"Smoke Signals" is a song written by Gene Evans and recorded by Slim Whitman, who released it in 1956 as a single (Imperial X8308, with "Curtain of Tears" on the opposite side).

Track listing

References 

1956 songs
1956 singles
Imperial Records singles
London Records singles
Slim Whitman songs